Egutu Chukwuma Oliseh (born 18 November 1980) is a Nigerian footballer currently playing for Greek club Olympiakos Laurium F.C. in the amateur Football League of Eastern Attica (EPSANA) as a midfielder. Having experience from Belgian, French and English football in earlier years, he is considered a Greek football journeyman, as he already played for seven different teams in Greece since his first arrival in the country in 2008.

Career
Oliseh started his career at Nancy. He was loaned out twice during his 5-year spell with the club. He subsequently transferred to Grenoble and La Louviere, before joining the Queens Park Rangers in 2006. His stay at QPR was unremarkable though, as he was deemed to be surplus to requirements by manager John Gregory. In January 2007, after only a six-month stay at the club, it was announced he had joined Montpellier. After one season, he moved to newly promoted Greek side Panthrakikos, in the Greek Superleague. After the club's relegation to the Football League in 2010, Oliseh was loaned out to Superleague side Ergotelis for two years. After his loaning spell ended, he went on to play for Panachaiki, Olympiakos Volou and Paniliakos, all in the Football League. On 30 July 2014 he joined Apollon Kalamarias and later on played for Apollon and Panserraikos in the same tier of Greek football. On 3 January 2017, it was announced that Oliseh moved to amateur side Olympiakos Lavriou in Eastern Attica, making this transfer the biggest in the club's history.

Personal life
He is the younger brother of Churchill Oliseh, Sunday Oliseh and Azubike Oliseh; his nephew is Sekou Oliseh.
He also holds French passport.

References

External links
 

1980 births
Nigerian footballers
Nigerian expatriate footballers
AS Nancy Lorraine players
Louhans-Cuiseaux FC players
AS Beauvais Oise players
Grenoble Foot 38 players
R.A.A. Louviéroise players
Queens Park Rangers F.C. players
Montpellier HSC players
Panthrakikos F.C. players
Ergotelis F.C. players
Panachaiki F.C. players
Olympiacos Volos F.C. players
Paniliakos F.C. players
Living people
Ligue 1 players
Ligue 2 players
Belgian Pro League players
English Football League players
Super League Greece players
Expatriate footballers in Greece
Expatriate footballers in England
Expatriate footballers in France
Association football midfielders